Delaplaine can refer to:
Isaac C. Delaplaine, 19th century New York politician
Delaplaine Family Papers,1762-1966 New-York Historical Society
Delaplaine, Arkansas